Scotsmac was an alcoholic drink consisting of a blend of wine and whisky flavouring. It was sold in 700ml bottles from discount supermarket stores such as Netto and Lidl across the United Kingdom. Scotsmac had a strength of 15%.  Also known as the "Bam's Dram" or "Wham's Dram", it was once blended by D & L Ariano, imported and bottled by J.H. Wham & Son (Largs) Ltd. It was bottled for Accolade Wines in Guildford, Surrey but was discontinued in 2018 as a result of  reduced demand.

See also

References

Cocktails with wine
Scotch whisky
Scottish alcoholic drinks